Jezus-Eik (in French: Notre-Dame-au-Bois) is a village in the municipality of Overijse in the province of Flemish Brabant, Belgium. 

Populated places in Flemish Brabant
Overijse